The House of Commons Liaison Committee (LIAI) is a non-standing, permanent committee of the House of Commons of Canada, established under standing order 107(1) consisting of a minimum of seven members and composed of the Chairs of all the standing committees and the Chairs of House of Commons standing joint committees, who may also be members of subcommittees. It is responsible for managing funds from the budget subcommittee to standing committees from the Board of Internal Economy and meets in camera to discuss administrative and financial issues relating to standing committees. associate members of the Liaison committee consist of the Vice-Chairs of standing committees and the House Vice-Chairs of standing joint committees.

Membership in the 43rd Canadian Parliament

Membership in the 42nd Canadian Parliament

Sub-Committees
Subcommittee on Committee Budgets (SBLI)

External links

References 

House of Commons of Canada
Committees of the House of Commons of Canada